Emmanuel Welbeck Nortey (born 8 August 1926) is a Ghanaian politician and also an Industrial Consultant. He served as a member of Parliament for the Klottey-Korley Constituency in the Greater Accra Region of Ghana.

Early life and education 
Nortey was born on 8 August 1926. He attended Manchester College of Commerce and Manchester College of Science and Technology where he obtained respectively his Bachelor of Arts in Economics and his Diploma in Industrial Management.

Politics 
Emmanuel Welbeck Nortey was elected into the First Parliament of the Fourth Republic on 7 January 1993 during the 1992 Ghanaian parliamentary election held on 29 December 1992.

Nortey took seat on the ticket of the National Democratic Congress. David Lamptey took the seat in 1996 Ghanaian general election with 20,485 votes representing 26.20% of the total valid votes cast during the 1996 Ghanaian Parliamentary elections over his opponents Tei Okunor an Independent Candidate who polled 17,205 votes which also represent 22.00% of the total votes cast, Gilbert K.Quartey of the New Patriotic Party also polling 17,090 votes representing 21.90% of the total votes cast, Adolf Lutterodt of the Convention People's Party polled 4,897 votes representing 6.30% of the total votes cast, Kwame Nyarko Akuffo-Mensah an Independent Candidate also polled 2,173 votes which represent 2.80% of the total votes cast, Buniyamin Mohamed Buniyamin of the People's National Convention had no votes cast so as Ahmed Nii Kpakpo Oti Vanderpu an Independent Candidate.

Career 
Nortey was the former member of the first parliament of the fourth republic of Ghana for Klottey-Korley constituency from 7 January 1993 to 7 January 1997. He was also a consultant.

Personal life 
Nortey is a Christian.

References 

1926 births
Possibly living people
21st-century Ghanaian politicians
Ghanaian MPs 1993–1997
National Democratic Congress (Ghana) politicians
Ghanaian Christians
People from Greater Accra Region
Ghanaian expatriates in the United Kingdom